Zhejiang Normal University (ZJNU) is a comprehensive public university in Jinhua city, Zhejiang province, China. Its main campus is next to the Shuanglong Cave national park and covers an area of more than 220 hectares with a total floor space of more than one million square meters.

History 
The university was originally established as the Hangzhou Normal Academy in 1956. It became the Hangzhou Normal College in 1958. In 1962, Hangzhou Normal College and the Zhejiang Teaching College merged to become the Zhejiang Normal College. In 1965, the college relocated to Jinhua.

In 1980, the college was classified as a tertiary education. In 1985, the college became the Zheijiang Normal University. Since then, it has expanded its colleges, departments and undergraduate programmes.

In 2000, 2001, and 2004, three more higher education merged into ZJNU: Zhejiang Financial School, Zhejiang School of Preschool-Teacher Education and the Jinhua Railway Engineering School respectively.

Profile 
As one of the key provincial universities, ZJNU specializes in teacher education with multiple branches of learning. The university consists of 18 colleges offering 61 undergraduate programs. It has an enrolment over 25,480 undergraduates, 4,300 postgraduates, and 15,000 adult students in adult education programs. Among the total staff of 2,640, there are 1,460 full-time instructors, including a Chinese Academy of Sciences Academician, 260 full professors and 650 associate professors. One professor was awarded the title of National Outstanding Scholar.

The university is named by the Ministry of Education as a Key National Training Base for Teachers of Vocational Education. In addition, it is designated by the Ministry of Railways as a base for the training of locomotive engineers. Moreover, Zhejiang Training Center for University and College Teachers is affiliated to the university for various in-service training programs.

At present, the university claims 24 provincial key disciplines, 6 provincial key construction disciplines, 3 provincial research bases and 63 master's degree programs. ZJNU offers other professional master's programs including M.Ed., MPA, MBA, MSW, MTCSOL, MA for Part-Time Vocational Education and MA of Science in Physical Education. The libraries at ZJNU have a collection of more than 3,000,000 traditional books and over 1,850,000 online books. 42 laboratories have been established, with a total floor space of 119,000 square meters, including one key laboratory of the Ministry of Education, one national key demonstration center of experiment instruction and 5 provincial key laboratories and key demonstration centers of experiment instruction.

The university makes strenuous efforts to open up to the outside world. In recent years, ties of academic exchange and cooperation have been set up between ZJNU and 92 foreign universities and research institutes in 42 countries. In 1996, ZJNU set up a Center for Chinese Language and Culture in Cameroon. In 1997, the university was authorized to accept short- and long-term international students.

Approved by the Ministry of Education, ZJNU established a Base for Education Assistance and Development in 2004 to undertake human resources development projects for senior education administrators from other continents. In addition, it has been authorized to run a center for overseas studies to assist self-funded students to study in foreign countries. In 2007, the university was authorized to accept international students supported by the Chinese Government Scholarship and established Confucius Institutes in Cameroon and Ukraine.

Following the motto of "wisdom with virtue, integrity with innovation", ZJNU is striding forward to build itself into a high-level comprehensive teaching and research university with its own characteristics.

College and schools 

Zhejiang Normal University has 18 colleges and schools that offers 61 study programs.
 Chuyang Honors College
Institute of African Studies
College of Economics and Management
College of Law and Political Science
Hangzhou College of Preschool Teacher Education
College of Physical Education and Health Sciences
College of Humanities
College of Foreign Languages
College of Geography and Environmental Sciences
College of Engineering
College of Music
College of International Culture and Education
College of Chemistry and Life Sciences
College of Teacher Education
College of Fine Arts
College of Mathematics Physics and Information Technology
College of Communication and Creative Culture
Xingzhi College
College of Vocational and Technical Education
Office of Postgraduate Teaching and Student Affairs

The university has a college in Hangzhou: Hangzhou Junior Teachers College.

Research centers 

Research Center for Light-emitting Diodes

References

External links
Zhejiang Normal University website

 
Teachers colleges in China
Universities and colleges in Zhejiang
Educational institutions established in 1956
1956 establishments in China